Central Jersey Riptide were an American soccer team that played in Clark, New Jersey.

They joined the USISL Pro League in 1996, but were relegated to the USL PDL in 1999. They became a provisional team the next season and then folded after the end of the season.

Year-by-year

Coaches
 Malcolm Murphy: 1996
 Mike Casper: 2000

Soccer clubs in New Jersey
Defunct Premier Development League teams
USL Second Division teams
Association football clubs established in 1996
Association football clubs disestablished in 2000
1996 establishments in New Jersey
2000 disestablishments in New Jersey